Oghenechovwe Donald Ekpeki or Ekpeki Oghenechovwe Donald is a Nigerian speculative fiction writer, editor and publisher.  His fiction and non-fiction have appeared in Omenana Magazine, Cosmic Roots and Eldritch Shores, Tor.com, Strange Horizons, Uncanny Magazine, NBC and more. He is a member of the African Speculative Fiction Society, SFWA, HWA, and Codex Writers Group.

Awards and nominations

|-
! scope="row" | 2019
| "The Witching Hour"
| Best short story
| Nommo Award
| 
| 
| 
|-
! scope="row" | 2020
| "Ife-Iyoku"
| Best short story
| Nommo Award
| 
| 
| 
|-
! scope="row" | 2020
| Ife-Iyoku, the Tale of Imadeyunuagbon
| Short fiction
| British Science Fiction Association Award 
| 
|
| 
|-
! scope="row" | 2020
| Dominion: An Anthology of Speculative Fiction From Africa and the African Diaspora
| Best Anthology
| This is Horror
| 
| Notes
| 
|-
! scope="row" | 2020
| Ife-Iyoku, the Tale of Imadeyunuagbon
| Best Novella
| Nebula Award
| 
| 
| 
|-
! scope="row" | 2020
| Ife-Iyoku, the Tale of Imadeyunuagbon
|
| Otherwise Award
| 
| 
| 
|-
! scope="row" | 2021
| Dominion: An Anthology of Speculative Fiction From Africa and the African Diaspora
| Best Anthology
| Locus Award
| 
| Top Ten
| 
|-
! scope="row" | 2021
| Dominion: An Anthology of Speculative Fiction From Africa and the African Diaspora
| Best Anthology
| British Fantasy Award
| 
| 
| 
|-
! scope="row" | 2021
| Ife-Iyoku, the Tale of Imadeyunuagbon
| Short fiction
| Theodore Sturgeon Award 
| 
| 
| 
|-
! scope="row" | 2022
| "O2 Arena"
| Best Novelette
| Nebula Award
| 
| 
| 
|-
! scope="row" | 2022
| "O2 Arena"
| Best Novelette
| Hugo Award
| 
|
| 
|-
! scope="row" | 2022
| 
| Best Editor, Short Form
| Hugo Award
| 
| 2nd place
|

Bibliography

Short stories

Novellas

Anthologies

References

External links
 
 

21st-century Nigerian novelists
Black speculative fiction authors
Living people
Nebula Award winners
Nigerian fantasy writers
Nigerian male novelists
Nigerian science fiction writers
Nigerian speculative fiction writers
Nigerian writers
Nommo Award winners
Year of birth missing (living people)